Enterococcus alcedinis  is a Gram-positive bacterium from the genus of Enterococcus which has been isolated from the cloaca of a common kingfisher.

References

alcedinis
Bacteria described in 2013